Steve J. Langdon (born 1948) is an American anthropologist noted for his work with the Tlingit people of southeastern Alaska.

He received his Ph.D. in anthropology from Stanford University in 1977.

He has taught anthropology at the University of Alaska Anchorage since 1976.

Langdon is the father of current New Orleans Pelicans general manager Trajan Langdon.

Bibliography
 Langdon, Steve J. (2002) The Native People of Alaska.  Wizard Works.
 Menzies, Charles R. (ed.) (2006) Traditional Ecological Knowledge and Natural Resource Management.  Lincoln: University of Nebraska Press.

References

1948 births
Living people
Stanford University alumni
Tlingit
University of Alaska Anchorage faculty
Writers from Anchorage, Alaska